Tøyen is a rapid transit station located in the Common Tunnel of Oslo Metro in Norway. Located in the borough of Gamle Oslo, it was also called "Tøyen-Munchmuseet" due to its proximity to the former art museum. The sign on platform 4 formerly said Munchmuseet underneath the station name, but it has been covered over with blue tape.  It is the last station on the east side shared by all lines; the Grorud Line and Ring Line departs from the other four lines at Tøyen. The station has three platforms, on the south side is a platform for all outbound trains. Across the tracks is another for inbound trains coming from Ensjø, and on the other side of this platform is a third one for inbound trains from Carl Berners plass. 

The station was opened on 22 May 1966 as part of the new metro lines to the eastern boroughs of Oslo.  Above the metro station is a shopping centre. The Munch Museum was formerly found here but it was relocated to Bjørvika, a few years ago. There is also a park north of the subway station with botanical gardens and paleontological, geological and zoological museums.

References

External links

Oslo Metro stations in Oslo
Railway stations opened in 1966
1966 establishments in Norway